Richard Couch may refer to:
 Sir Richard Couch (judge), Anglo-Indian judge
 Richard Couch (wrestler), British Olympic wrestler
 Richard Quiller Couch, British naturalist

See also
 Dick Couch, American author, professor, and former U.S. Navy SEAL